Enderlin is a city in Cass and Ransom counties in the State of North Dakota. The population was 881 at the 2020 census.

History
Enderlin was founded in 1891. One of the oldest buildings in town, the Robert Lindemann House, was built in 1913 and is on the National Register of Historic Places.

Local folklore suggests the name is derived from the semi-German "End der Line" ("end of the line"), as the city was briefly the terminus of the Soo Line Railroad's main line through North Dakota. Another explanation is that the name was suggested by the wife of a Soo Line official and comes from a fictional character in a book.

Geography
Enderlin is located at  (46.622365, -97.600125), along the Maple River.

Climate
This climatic region is typified by large seasonal temperature differences, with warm to hot (and often humid) summers and cold (sometimes severely cold) winters.  According to the Köppen Climate Classification system, Enderlin has a humid continental climate, abbreviated "Dfb" on climate maps.

Demographics

2010 census
At the census of 2010, there were 886 people, 386 households, and 225 families living in the city. The racial makup of the city was 98.6% White, 0.2% African American, 0.8% Native American, 0.1% Asian, and 0.2% from two or more races. Hispanic or Latino of any race were 2.4%.

Of the 386 households 24.4% had children under the age of 18 living with them, 49.0% were married couples living together, 6.2% had a female householder with no husband present, 3.1% had a male householder with no wife present, and 41.7% were non-families. 38.3% of households were one person and 19.4% were one person aged 65 or older. The average household size was 2.16 and the average family size was 2.81.

The median age was 48.5 years. 21.6% of residents were under the age of 18; 5% were between the ages of 18 and 24; 18.8% were from 25 to 44; 29.4% were from 45 to 64; and 25.2% were 65 or older. The gender makeup of the city was 49.2% male and 50.8% female.

2000 census
At the census of 2000, there were 947 people, 406 households, and 233 families living in the city. The population density was 670.1 people per square mile (259.3/km). There were 481 housing units at an average density of 340.4 per square mile (131.7/km). The racial makup of the city was 95.88% White, 0.32% African American, 0.42% Native American, 0.32% Asian, 0.95% from other races, and 2.11% from two or more races. Hispanic or Latino of any race were 2.32% of the population.

Of the 406 households 27.3% had children under the age of 18 living with them, 47.8% were married couples living together, 6.2% had a female householder with no husband present, and 42.4% were non-families. 37.9% of households were one person and 20.2% were one person aged 65 or older. The average household size was 2.20 and the average family size was 2.96.

The age distribution was 22.8% under the age of 18, 5.5% from 18 to 24, 23.4% from 25 to 44, 22.6% from 45 to 64, and 25.7% 65 or older. The median age was 44 years. For every 100 females, there were 99.8 males. For every 100 females age 18 and over, there were 96.5 males.

The median household income was $32,589 and the median family income  was $41,250. Males had a median income of $36,042 versus $21,023 for females. The per capita income for the city was $20,883. About 4.7% of families and 7.1% of the population were below the poverty line, including 7.1% of those under age 18 and 6.6% of those age 65 or over.

Economy
Railway shipping remains an important part of the local economy, with the Soo Line, now a subsidiary of the Canadian Pacific Railway, continuing to operate a yard in the city. Another important part of the local economy is an ADM edible oil processing plant located just southeast of town.

Places of worship
 First Lutheran Church – ECLA Congregation
 Trinity Lutheran Church – founded in 1884 by German immigrants, and after 1941 all services were in English.
 St. Patrick Catholic Church – only Roman Catholic church in Enderlin
 First United Methodist Church

Notable people

 Kenneth O. Bjork, educator and historian
 T. Keith Glennan, space agency director
 Gaylord T. Gunhus, United States Army chaplain
 John Wall, North Dakota educator and politician
 Cy Pieh, professional baseball player

References

External links
 City of Enderlin official website
 Enderlin Online - Local News, Weather, Classifieds & More
 Ransom County official website
 Enderlin Historical Society official website

Populated places established in 1891
Cities in Cass County, North Dakota
Cities in Ransom County, North Dakota
Cities in North Dakota
1891 establishments in North Dakota